Manfred Kooy (born 6 July 1970) is a Paralympian athlete from the Netherlands competing mainly in category T38 middle-distance events.

Kooy has competed in three Paralympics, firstly in Barcelona in 1992 where he competed in the 100m, 200m, 400m and 800m in the C8 class without any medal success.  In 1996 he moved to competing in the 800m and 1500m winning the bronze medal in the T37 800m.  By 2000 having moved to T38 class he missed out on a medal in his only event, the T38 800m.

External links
 profile on paralympic.org

1970 births
Living people
Dutch male sprinters
Dutch male middle-distance runners
Paralympic athletes of the Netherlands
Athletes (track and field) at the 1992 Summer Paralympics
Athletes (track and field) at the 1996 Summer Paralympics
Athletes (track and field) at the 2000 Summer Paralympics
Paralympic bronze medalists for the Netherlands
People from Overbetuwe
Medalists at the 1996 Summer Paralympics
Paralympic medalists in athletics (track and field)
20th-century Dutch people
21st-century Dutch people
Sportspeople from Gelderland